The Men's road race of the 2018 UCI Road World Championships was a cycling event that took place on 30 September 2018 in Innsbruck, Austria. It was the 85th edition of the championship, and Slovakia's Peter Sagan was the three times defending champion, a record in the event. 188 riders from 44 nations entered the competition.

After previously winning six medals in the race without taking the gold medal, Spain's Alejandro Valverde took his first world title after a four-rider sprint finish decided the medals. Valverde went clear with a small group of riders on the steep Höttinger Höll climb, making headway on the descent with France's Romain Bardet and Canadian rider Michael Woods. Tom Dumoulin (Netherlands) joined the trio on the run-in to the finish, but his efforts to do so resulted in him missing out on the medals, behind Bardet (silver) and Woods (bronze).

Valverde's victory was the first for Spain in the event since Óscar Freire won the title in Verona, Italy in 2004. France and Canada also ended long streaks without a medal in the event as Bardet's silver was the first medal for France since Anthony Geslin won the bronze medal in Madrid, Spain in 2005, while Woods won only the second medal for a Canadian male rider in the road race, after Steve Bauer's bronze medal at the 1984 race, also in Spain in Barcelona.

Course
After , the riders crossed the finish line for the first time, before starting six laps of a circuit  in length. After a short period of flat roads, the race descended through Igls back towards Innsbruck.

The climb featured an average gradient of 11.5%, with a portion of the climb reaching 28% around two-thirds up. In total, the race featured  of climbing.

Qualification
Qualification was based mainly on the UCI World Ranking by nations as of 12 August 2018. The first ten nations in this classification qualified eight riders to start, the next ten nations qualified six riders to start, with the nations ranked 21st to 30th qualifying five riders to start. One rider from each of the next twenty nations was also qualified to start. In addition to this number, any rider within the top 200 of the UCI World Ranking by individuals that was not already qualified, the outgoing World Champion and the current continental champions were also able to take part.

UCI World Rankings
The following nations qualified.

Continental champions

Participating nations
188 cyclists from 44 nations were entered in the men's road race. The number of cyclists per nation is shown in parentheses.

Results

Final classification

Failed to finish
112 riders failed to finish.

References

External links
Road race page at Innsbruck-Tirol 2018 website

Men's road race
UCI Road World Championships – Men's road race
2018 in men's road cycling